Kafr Laha, Hama  is a Syrian village located in Wadi al-Uyun Nahiyah in Masyaf District, Hama.  According to the Syria Central Bureau of Statistics (CBS), Kafr Laha, Hama had a population of 379 in the 2004 census.

History
In 1838, Kafr Laha's inhabitants were noted to be predominantly Sunni Muslims.

References

Bibliography

 

Populated places in Masyaf District